Un Lucero en la México is Lucero's first ever live recording. Recorded during her 1999 concert in "La Plaza de Toros", Mexico. The album was a 2 disc release, with the first being the Pop/Ballad Music, and the second disc, all the mariachi songs. It was released on 18 November 1999. The sales eventually led to a gold status in Mexico.

Track listing
The album is composed by 32 songs, divided into two discs, one for pop and the other one for rancheras.

Singles

Sales and certifications

1999 albums
Lucero (entertainer) albums

References

1999 live albums
Lucero (entertainer) live albums